The Right Honourable Sir Gregory Knight (born 4 April 1949) is a British politician, author and musician. He has served as the Conservative MP for East Yorkshire since 2001, having previously served as the MP for Derby North from 1983 to 1997.  He served as a minister in the governments of Margaret Thatcher, John Major and David Cameron.

Education and professional life

Born in Blaby, Leicestershire, Knight was educated at Alderman Newton's Grammar School, Leicester, and the College of Law Guildford, qualifying as a solicitor in 1973.

Political career
Knight served as a Leicester City Councillor for Castle Ward and Leicestershire County Councillor for Evington Division from 1976 to 1981.

He was MP for Derby North from 1983 until the 1997 election, when he lost his seat. He returned to the House of Commons in 2001 after successfully contesting the East Yorkshire seat.

As a backbencher, in the 1980s, he succeeded in amending licensing law in England and Wales by doubling 'drinking up time' on licensed premises from ten to twenty minutes, a concession that was welcomed by the industry and drinkers alike. However the 2003 Licensing Act ended standard permitted hours and provides for an unspecified drinking up time determined by the licensee's discretion.

He is in favour of bringing back capital punishment and spoke out against the apartheid government of South Africa during the 1980s.

He was deputy Chief Whip under John Major between 1993 and 1996 and Minister of State for Industry at the Department of Trade and Industry from 1996 until the Conservative defeat at the 1997 election. He was made a Privy Councillor in 1995, entitling him to the style "Right Honourable".

He served under Michael Howard as a shadow minister for Environment and Transport until 2005. In the 2005–10 Parliament, he was chairman of the House of Commons Procedure Committee and on four other House of Commons select committees: the Liaison Committee, Administration Committee, the Committee on Modernisation of the House and the Standards and Privileges Committee. He was re-elected unopposed to the chair of the Procedure Committee in 2010.

In 2009, The Daily Telegraph reported that Knight had claimed £2,600 in expenses for "driveway repairs" at his constituency home, though Knight stated that his cars were kept separately and paid for out of his own pocket.

Knight has successfully piloted two of his Private Members Bills into law. In 2011, he was successful in taking through Parliament the Estates of Deceased Persons (Forfeiture Rule and Law of Succession) Act 2011, a bill to make the distribution of estates fairer.

He rejoined the government in September 2012 as a senior whip and Vice Chamberlain of the Royal Household, a position he held until October 2013.

Knight is a Eurosceptic and is in favour of Brexit.

In 2018 he introduced his second Private Member's Bill, the Parking (Code of Practice) Bill, which mandates the Government to introduce a statutory code of practice for the operators of private car parks, to require transparency and good practice to ensure that motorists are not treated unreasonably. The bill was passed by Parliament and became an Act in March 2019. 

Knight has argued in Parliament for "double summertime", which would see the clocks go forward by two hours during summer.

He is Secretary of the British American Parliamentary Group, one of the largest and most active all-party groups at Westminster.
An avid motorist, he is critical of initiatives seen as 'anti-car', such as congestion charging, pedestrianisation schemes, speed humps and some 'park and ride' proposals. He is chairman of the All-Party Parliamentary Historic Vehicles Group and successfully called on the Government to exempt historic vehicles from MOT tests. In 2011 he was shortlisted as the 'Industry Champion of the Year' by the International Historic Motoring Awards, for his work in supporting the historic and classic car movement.

Personal life
He plays the drums and is a founder member of MP4—the world's only parliamentary rock group. The others are fellow MPs Kevin Brennan and Peter Wishart and former MP Ian Cawsey. While a Leicester councillor, he co-wrote and played on "It's a Leicester Fiesta" (1979). He has backed several other artists on the drums in live shows including George McCrae and Fergal Sharkey and, in the studio, he played drums backing KT Tunstall, Steve Harley, Ricky Wilson and David Gray on the charity single "You Can't Always Get What You Want" released in December 2016 by Chrysalis Records.

Honours
  In 1995, he was sworn in as a member of Her Majesty's Most Honourable Privy Council. This gave him the Honorific Title "The Right Honourable" for life.
  In October 2013, he was awarded a Knighthood for political service. This gave him the Honorific Title "Sir" for life.

Publications
Westminster Words (1988), published by Buchan and Enright
Honourable Insults (1990), published by Robson Books
Parliamentary Sauce (1993), published by Robson Books
Right Honourable Insults (1998), published by Chrysalis Books
Naughty Graffiti (2005), published by Anova Books
Dishonourable Insults (2011), published by The Robson Press

References

External links
 gregknight.com
 

1949 births
Conservative Party (UK) MPs for English constituencies
Knights Bachelor
Living people
Members of the Privy Council of the United Kingdom
People from Blaby
UK MPs 1983–1987
UK MPs 1987–1992
UK MPs 1992–1997
UK MPs 2001–2005
UK MPs 2005–2010
UK MPs 2010–2015
UK MPs 2015–2017
UK MPs 2017–2019
UK MPs 2019–present
Politics of the East Riding of Yorkshire
Members of the Parliament of the United Kingdom for constituencies in Derbyshire
People educated at Alderman Newton's School, Leicester
Treasurers of the Household
Conservative Party (UK) councillors
Councillors in Leicestershire
Politicians awarded knighthoods